The Michigan Public Service Commission (MPSC) is a regulatory agency which regulates public utilities in the state of Michigan, including electric power, telecommunications, and natural gas services.  The MPSC's headquarters are located in Lansing, Michigan.

Mission
The mission of the MPSC is to protect the public by ensuring safe, reliable, and accessible energy and telecommunications services at reasonable rates for Michigan's residents.

Commissioners
The MPSC is composed of three members appointed by the Governor with the advice and consent of the Senate. Commissioners are appointed to serve staggered six-year terms. No more than two Commissioners may represent the same political party. One commissioner is designated as chairman by the Governor.

Katherine L. Peretick was appointed by Governor Gretchen Whitmer to serve on the MPSC on January 4, 2021. Her term ends July 2, 2021.

Daniel C. Scripps was appointed by Governor Gretchen Whitmer to serve on the MPSC on February 25, 2019, and as Chairman on July 16, 2020. His term ends July 2, 2023.

Tremaine L. Phillips was appointed by Governor Gretchen Whitmer to serve on the MPSC on September 9, 2019. His term ends July 2, 2025.

References

External links

Public Service
Michigan
Public utilities established in 1939
1939 establishments in Michigan
Public utilities of the United States